Kulen Vakuf (Serbian Cyrillic: Кулен Вакуф) is a village in the municipality of Bihać, Bosnia and Herzegovina.

Kulen Vakuf was the birthplace of Bosnian Ottoman nobleman Mehmed-beg Kulenović.

Demographics 
According to the 2013 census, its population was 1,618.

See also 
 Kulen Vakuf massacre

References 

Populated places in Bihać